Jiří Hradil (born 1986) is a Czech mountain bike orienteer. He won a silver medal in the sprint event at the 2008 World MTB Orienteering Championships in Ostróda. At the 2009 World MTB Orienteering Championships in Ben Shemen he won a silver medal in the middle distance, and a silver medal with the Czech relay team.

References

1986 births
Czech orienteers
Male orienteers
Czech male cyclists
Mountain bike orienteers
Living people